Pichilemu Blues is a 1993 book written by Chilean politician Esteban Valenzuela. A movie based on the book was also released, starring Peggy Cordero, Ximena Nogueira and Evaristo Acevedo.

Plot
The Pichilemu Blues story is situated in Pichilemu during the summer of 1973. The main characters are a group of teenagers that are discovering a world abounded with hippies, sexual revolutions, ideological transformations, its own language (Chilean Spanish) and anxiety to change the world.

References

1993 novels
Books about Pichilemu
Spanish-language literature